William Horace Wallbanks (9 April 1918 – 2004) was an English professional footballer who played as a winger.

References

1918 births
2004 deaths
Footballers from Tyne and Wear
English footballers
Association football wingers
Chopwell F.C. players
Ashington A.F.C. players
Aberdeen F.C. players
Grimsby Town F.C. players
Luton Town F.C. players
Weymouth F.C. players
English Football League players